Cherry Rush is the debut extended play by South Korean girl group Cherry Bullet. It was released on January 20, 2021 by FNC and distributed by Kakao M. The EP contains five tracks (seven tracks on CD), including the lead single "Love So Sweet".

Background and release 
On January 8, 2020, FNC Entertainment announced that Cherry Bullet would make a comeback with their first EP Cherry Rush on January 20. They also revealed "Love So Sweet" as the lead single. On January 10, they released the group concept photos for Cherry Rush. On January 11, the first set of the individual concept photos for Cherry Rush was released. On January 12, the second set of the individual concept photos for Cherry Rush was released. On January 14, they released the first music video teaser for "Love So Sweet". On January 16, the tracklist and the highlight medley for the EP was released. On January 18, they released the second music video teaser for "Love So Sweet".

On January 20, they released Cherry Rush along with the music video for "Love So Sweet".

Promotion 
Earlier, on January 16, FNC stated that Yuju would not be participating in any group activities until January 22 because she was still in quarantine after a confirmed case of COVID-19 at the filming site where she was filming a web drama. Hence, Cherry Bullet had a six-member press showcase on January 20, 2021.

Cherry Bullet had their first weekly music chart shows performance for "Love So Sweet" at Mnet's M Countdown. Then, they continue to promote the single at KBS2's Music Bank, MBC's Show! Music Core, SBS's Inkigayo.

Track listing 
Credits adapted from Melon.

Accolades

Charts

Release history

References 

2021 EPs
Korean-language EPs
FNC Entertainment EPs
Kakao M EPs